The Eurovision Young Musicians 2018 was the nineteenth edition of the Eurovision Young Musicians contest. This edition was a co-production between the European Broadcasting Union (EBU), the Edinburgh International Festival and the British Broadcasting Corporation (BBC) as host broadcaster. Musicians representing eighteen countries with EBU membership participated in the contest, with  making their debut alongside seven returning countries, while  withdrew from participation for the first time.

The final concert took place at the Usher Hall in Edinburgh on 23 August 2018, with the BBC Scottish Symphony Orchestra under their principal conductor Thomas Dausgaard. It was produced by BBC Cymru Wales for broadcast by BBC Scotland and BBC Radio 3, with Petroc Trelawny and Josie d'Arby being the presenters for the show.

Location

Usher Hall, the venue for the final, is a concert hall situated on Lothian Road, in the west end of Edinburgh, Scotland. It has hosted concerts and events since its construction in 1914 and can hold approximately 2,900 people in its recently restored auditorium, which is well loved by performers due to its acoustics. The Hall is flanked by The Royal Lyceum Theatre on the right and The Traverse Theatre on the left. Historic Scotland has registered the Hall with Category A listed building status.

The hall previously hosted the Eurovision Song Contest 1972 after , which won the year before, was unable to provide a suitable venue. The last time the United Kingdom hosted a Eurovision network contest was the Eurovision Dance Contest 2008 in Glasgow.

Bidding phase
According to an earlier statement by Vladislav Yakovlev, the former executive supervisor of the event, Budapest could host the 2018 contest after bidding for the 2016 edition. On 27 October 2016, the European Broadcasting Union (EBU) launched a call to submit applications for the competition.

Host city announcement
In early October 2017, Norwegian broadcaster Norwegian Broadcasting Corporation (NRK) confirmed in an online article regarding its national selection Virtuos, that the United Kingdom would host this edition of the contest in August 2018. On 30 October 2017, the EBU announced that this edition of the contest would be held in Edinburgh between 16 and 24 of August 2018.

Format
The semi-final round returned in 2018, produced by BBC Radio 3 in the form of public chamber recitals, at the Studio of the Edinburgh Festival Theatre on 18 and 19 August 2018.

Presenters
On 6 August 2018, it was announced that Petroc Trelawny and Josie D'Arby would host the 2018 competition. Trelawny’s career started at BBC Radio Devon in 1989 as a reporter, before he made his transition to a career in classical music radio and television during the 1990s. Since 1998 he has been a presenter at BBC Radio 3, and is the face of classical magazine programme Music Matters, Radio 3’s Breakfast and concerts in Radio 3 Live in Concert. D’Arby started on Children's BBC (CBBC) in the 1990s before becoming the youngest woman to have her own chat show, Josie, in 1999 on Channel 5. She has co-presented a number of cultural programs for the BBC including; Young Musician of the Year since 2012, Cardiff Singer of the World since 2009, Songs of Praise since 2014 and Young Choir of the Year (2018). Her acting credits include playing series regular WPC Jodie Finn, in BBC One drama Merseybeat from 2002–04. On 11 August 2018, it was revealed that the semi finals would be hosted by Trelawny, with D'Arby joining him in the final.

Jury members
The winner of the competition was decided by an international panel of classical music luminaries. On 10 August 2018, the EBU announced the jurors of the competition. The judges for the semi-finals are British bassoonist Ursula Leveaux, Spanish percussionist Noè Roderigo Gisbert, Korean pianist Sinae Lee, and the chair cellist and conductor David Watkin. Joining Watkin's at the final were American conductor and violinist Marin Alsop, composer and performer Anna Meredith, Scottish classical composer and conductor James MacMillan and Head of Music for the Edinburgh International Festival, Andrew Moore.

Voting
Altogether there are two set of juries: one for the two days of semi-finals and one for the final. In both juries, each juror was to independently rate each performer a score from 1–10 points. The following criteria were taken into account by the jurors in the semi-finals and finals:

 Technical Accuracy
 Quality of Sound
 Interpretation
 Performance

After each juror has awarded his points, these were added together and the result presented to the jury first. However following discussion, the jury may make changes to the numerical rankings by mutual agreement. The six finalists were announced in a random order after the semi-finals on a separate live stream. In addition, it was announced that the jury in the final would not know the results of the semi-final jury to avoid interference. In the final, only the winner was announced during the televised broadcast.

Participating countries

Semi-finals
The semi-finals consisted of six hour-long shows spread over two days. A total of eighteen countries took part, of which six qualified to the grand final. In each semi-final, three musicians performed, either solo or with piano accompaniment, for a total of 18 minutes each.

18 August

19 August

Final
Six contestants were selected by the first jury to progress to the Final and the second decided the winner of Eurovision Young Musicians 2018. Each finalist performed one or more movements of a single musical work, accompanied by the BBC Scottish Symphony Orchestra, for up to 12 minutes. During the live shows interval, the orchestra performed "Hedwig's Theme" from the Harry Potter score although this was not included in the televised broadcast. The winner received a custom-made engraved trophy, a cash prize of €7,000, and a performance opportunity with the BBC Scottish Symphony Orchestra in a forthcoming season. The runner-up received a cash prize of €3,000.

Broadcasting
The following countries, listed in order of broadcasting dates, confirmed that they would broadcast the contest along with the dates of broadcasting schedules. Alongside television and radio, coverage was also livestreamed on the online platforms of the broadcasters in Belgium, Czech Republic, Estonia, Greece, Poland, San Marino, Slovenia, Spain and the UK. The semi-finals and the final were broadcast live on the internet via the official YouTube channel of the competition.

Semi-finals

Final

Other countries
For a country to be eligible for potential participation in the Eurovision Young Musicians, it needs to be an active member of the European Broadcasting Union (EBU). It is unknown whether the EBU issue invitations of participation to all 56 active members like they do for the Eurovision Song Contest and Junior Eurovision Song Contest. The EBU Active Members listed below have made the following announcements in regards to their decisions.

Active EBU Members
  – On 29 October 2017, the Austrian broadcaster Österreichischer Rundfunk (ORF) announced that they were discussing whether they will participate in Eurovision Young Musicians 2018. Austria decided to withdraw from the 2018 edition, after participating at every previous edition of the contest, with no reasons for their withdrawal being published.
  – On 24 October 2017, BHRT confirmed that due to financial difficulties the country would not return to the contest in 2018. Bosnia and Herzegovina's last, and only, participation was at the  Young Musicians event.
  – On 2 January 2018, Cyprus Broadcasting Corporation (CyBC) confirmed that due to financial difficulties the country would not return to the contest in 2018. Cyprus last participated at the  Young Musicians event.
  – On 3 January 2018, Danish Broadcasting Corporation (DR) confirmed that the country would not return to the contest in 2018 and are unlikely to participate in the competition in the coming years. Denmark last participated at the  Young Musicians event.
  – On 12 January 2018, Yleisradio (YLE) confirmed that the country would not return to the contest in 2018. Finland last participated at the  Young Musicians event.
  – On 28 October 2017, Raidió Teilifís Éireann (RTÉ) announced that it would not return to the 2018 Eurovision Young Musicians. Ireland last participated at the  Young Musicians event. However, the Irish-language broadcaster, TG4, which is eligible to take over the responsibility of Ireland's participation, has not released any statements regarding a return to the contest. Ireland was not on the final list of participants released by the EBU.
  – On 4 November 2017, Latvijas Televīzija (LTV) confirmed that the country would not return to the contest in 2018. Latvia last participated at the  Young Musicians event.
  – On 30 January 2018, Omroep NTR (NTR) confirmed that the country would not return to the contest in 2018. The Netherlands last participated at the  Young Musicians event.
  – On 11 November 2017, Schweizer Radio und Fernsehen (SRF) confirmed that the country would not return to the contest in 2018. Switzerland last participated at the  Young Musicians event.
  – On 5 January 2018, National Public Broadcasting Company of Ukraine (UA:PBC) announced that the country is considering a return to the contest in 2018. However, on 14 January 2018, UA:PBC confirmed that the country will not return to the Eurovision Young Musicians in 2018. Ukraine last participated at the  Young Musicians event.

The following list of countries have participated at least once since the inaugural contest in  but have not stated their reasons for their continued absence in competing:

See also 
Junior Eurovision Song Contest 2018
Eurovision Song Contest 2018

Notes and references

Notes

References

External links 

 
 

2018 in music
2018 in Scotland
August 2018 events in the United Kingdom
Eurovision Young Musicians by year
Events in Edinburgh